, provisional designation: , is a sizable centaur and retrograde damocloid from the outer Solar System, approximately  in diameter. It was discovered on 24 June 2011, by astronomers with the Pan-STARRS 1 at the Haleakala Obs. in Hawaii.

Orbit and classification 

 orbits the Sun at a distance of 11.1–31.2 AU once every 97 years and 2 months (35,473  days; semi-major axis of 21.13 AU). Its orbit has an eccentricity of 0.47 and an inclination of 100° with respect to the ecliptic. The body's observation arc begins at Pan-STARRS in June 2010.

Retrograde centaur and damocloid 

 is a member of the centaurs, a population of inward-moving bodies transiting from the Kuiper belt to the group of Jupiter-family comets. Orbiting mainly between Jupiter and Neptune, they typically have a semi-major axis of 5.5 to 30.1 AU. Centaurs are cometary-like bodies with an eccentric orbit. Their short dynamical lifetime is due to the perturbing forces exerted on them by the outer planets of the Solar System.

The object is on a retrograde orbit as it has an inclination of more than 90°. The object also meets the orbital definition for being a damocloid. This is a small group of cometary-like objects without a coma or tail and a Tisserand's parameter with respect to Jupiter of less than 2 besides a retrograde orbit.

Numbering and naming 

This minor planet has no number yet.

Physical characteristics

Diameter and albedo 

According to the survey of centaurs and scattered-disk objects carried out by the NEOWISE mission of NASA's Wide-field Infrared Survey Explorer,  measures 64 kilometers in diameter and its surface has an albedo of 0.083, which makes it too small to be considered as a dwarf-planet candidate.

Rotation period 

, no rotational lightcurve of has been obtained from photometric observations. The body's rotation period, pole and shape remain unknown.

See also

References

External links 
 List Of Centaurs and Scattered-Disk Objects, Minor Planet Center
 
 

2011 MM4
Minor planet object articles (unnumbered)

20110624
Minor planets with a retrograde orbit